Sir Timothy Robert Peter Brighouse (born 15 January 1940) is a British educator. He was the Schools Commissioner for London between 2002–2007, where he led the London Challenge.

Biography
He was born in Leicestershire (1940) and was brought up there and in East Anglia. He was educated at Loughborough Grammar School and at Lowestoft County Grammar School and St Catherine's College, Oxford. He took his PGCE at the Oxford University Department of Education in 1961. He began his career as a schoolteacher, becoming a deputy head in a South Wales secondary modern school in 1966.

In the early 1970s he worked for Buckinghamshire County Council's education department, and worked with Geoff Cooksey on plans for Stantonbury Campus, the first secondary school of Milton Keynes.

Later he was Professor of Education at Keele University (1989–1993), and Chief Education Officer in both Oxfordshire (1978–1989) and Birmingham Local Authorities.

Whilst he was at Birmingham, he was described by Conservative Education Secretary John Patten as a "madman....wandering the streets, frightening the children". Brighouse sued and won substantial damages, which he donated to charity. He used some of it to set up the University of the First Age, to encourage out of hours activities to enrich school children's learning.

In May 1997 Brighouse was awarded an honorary degree from the Open University as Doctor of the University.

He was the Schools Commissioner for London between 2002–2007, where he led the London Challenge.

Brighouse was a Non-Executive Director of RM plc the UK educational IT company.

Brighouse was knighted in the 2009 New Year Honours.

Personal life
He is married to Mary Elizabeth "Liz" Brighouse ( Demer), who is leader of the Labour group on Oxfordshire County Council. They have four children and eight grandchildren.

Books

The A-Z of School Improvement: Principles and Practice (28 Mar 2013)
Inspirations: A collection of commentaries and quotations to promote school improvement (1 Oct 2006)
What Makes a Good School Now? (6 May 2008)
How to Improve Your School (21 Jan 1999)
The Joy of Teaching (15 Apr 2008)
About our Schools, with Mick Waters (2022)

References

External links
Biography at the Guardian

Academics of Keele University
British educational theorists
Knights Bachelor
Living people
Alumni of St Catherine's College, Oxford
People educated at Loughborough Grammar School
1940 births